The 6th Poona Divisional Area was an infantry division of the British Indian Army that formed part of the Indian Army during the First World War.  It was formed in October 1914 to replace the original 6th (Poona) Division that had been mobilized in September 1914 for service in Mesopotamia.  It was renamed as Poona Division in June 1917 and remained in India throughout the war.  The division was redesignated as Poona District in 1920.

History
At the outbreak of the First World War, the 6th (Poona) Division was mobilized in September 1914 and sailed from Bombay on 16 October for Mesopotamia.  The 6th Poona Divisional Area was formed in October 1914 to take over the area responsibilities of the 6th (Poona) Division.  It took over the units left behind by the original division and initially only commanded Bombay Brigade, joined by the reformed Poona Brigade in December.  However, the Ahmednagar Brigade was not formed until May 1918, followed by the 58th and 59th Indian Brigades in June.  Bombay Brigade became independent in the same month.

The division served in India throughout the war, initially under Southern Army, then Southern Command from January 1918.  From early 1918, the division was responsible for a significant part of the expansion of the British Indian Army.

In 1918, the division was responsible for posts and stations at Ahmednagar, Anandi, Arangaon, Belgaum, Dhond, Kirkee, Kholapur, Manmad, Poona and Satara.  Bombay Brigade was responsible for Ahmedabad, Baroda, Bombay, Colaba, Dadar, Deolali, Nasik, Rajkot and Santa Cruz.  It was renamed Poona Division in June 1917 and was redesignated as Poona District in June 1920.

Order of battle
The division commanded the following brigades in the First World War:
 Bombay Brigadejoined in October 1914 from 6th (Poona) Division; became an independent formation in June 1918
 Poona Brigadeformed in December 1914
 Ahmednagar Brigadeformed in May 1918
 58th Indian Brigadeformed in June 1918; transferred to 2nd (Rawalpindi) Division in November 1918
 59th Indian Brigadeformed in June 1918; transferred to 2nd (Rawalpindi) Division in November 1918

Commanders
The 6th Poona Divisional Area / Poona Division had the following commanders:

See also

 6th (Poona) Division for the original division
 List of Indian divisions in World War I

Notes

References

Bibliography

External links

British Indian Army divisions
Indian World War I divisions
Military units and formations established in 1914
Military units and formations disestablished in 1920